Eaton Peak is a  double summit mountain located in the Canadian Cascades of southwestern British Columbia, Canada. The peak was first climbed in 1950 by J. Butcher, F. Rodgers, and E. Jenkins. The peak was named to honor Canadian Army Private Douglas B. Eaton (1911-1944), from nearby Chilliwack, who was killed in action in World War II. The mountain's name was officially adopted April 7, 1955, by the Geographical Names Board of Canada. Nearby Eaton Creek and Eaton Lake were named in memory of his younger brother, William, also killed in action a year earlier. Precipitation runoff from the peak drains into Silverhope Creek, a tributary of the Fraser River.

Geology

Eaton Peak is related to the Chilliwack batholith, which intruded the region 26 to 29 million years ago after the major orogenic episodes in the region. This is part of the Pemberton Volcanic Belt, an eroded volcanic belt that formed as a result of subduction of the Farallon Plate starting 29 million years ago. 

During the Pleistocene period dating back over two million years ago, glaciation advancing and retreating repeatedly scoured the landscape leaving deposits of rock debris. The "U"-shaped cross section of the river valleys are a result of recent glaciation. Uplift and faulting in combination with glaciation have been the dominant processes which have created the tall peaks and deep valleys of the North Cascades area.

The North Cascades features some of the most rugged topography in the Cascade Range with craggy peaks and ridges, deep glacial valleys, and granite spires. Geological events occurring many years ago created the diverse topography and drastic elevation changes over the Cascade Range leading to various climate differences which lead to vegetation variety defining the ecoregions in this area.

Climate

Most weather fronts originate in the Pacific Ocean, and travel east toward the Cascade Range where they are forced upward by the range (Orographic lift), causing them to drop their moisture in the form of rain or snowfall. As a result, the Cascade Mountains experience high precipitation, especially during the winter months in the form of snowfall. Temperatures can drop below −20 °C with wind chill factors below −30 °C. The months July through September offer the most favorable weather for climbing Eaton Peak.

Climbing Routes

Established climbing routes on Eaton Peak:
 
 West Ridge -  
 Southeast Ridge 
 North Ridge

See also

 Geography of the North Cascades

References

External links
 Eaton Peak aerial photo: PBase
 Weather forecast: Eaton Peak
 Climbing Eaton Peak: YouTube

Two-thousanders of British Columbia
Canadian Cascades
Cascade Range
North Cascades
Yale Division Yale Land District